Graph Aligner (GRAAL) is an algorithm for global network alignment that is based solely on network topology. GRAAL matches pairs of nodes originating in different networks based on their graphlet degree signature similarities, where a higher similarity between two nodes corresponds to a higher topological similarity between their extended neighborhoods (out to distance 4). GRAAL produces global alignments, i.e., it aligns each node in the smaller network to exactly one node in the larger network. The matching proceeds using a technique analogous to the "seed and extend" approach of the popular BLAST algorithm for sequence alignment: it first chooses a single "seed" pair of nodes (one node from each network) with high graphlet degree signature similarity. It then expands the alignment radially outward around the seed as far as practical using a greedy algorithm (see [Kuchaiev et al., 2010] for details).

Method
The cost of aligning two nodes takes into account the graphlet degree signature similarity between them, modified to reduce the cost as the degrees of both nodes increase, since higher degree nodes with similar signatures provide a tighter constraint than correspondingly similar low degree nodes. In this way, GRAAL align the densest parts of the networks first.
.

Ties are broken randomly. Spheres of the same radius in two networks are then greedily aligned together by searching for the pairs  and  that are not already aligned and that can be aligned with the minimal cost. When all spheres around the seed  have been aligned, some nodes in both networks may remain unaligned. Note that .

Application
GRAAL was used to align two protein-protein interaction (PPI) networks and predict biological function of unannotated proteins based on the function of their annotated aligned partners. Also, GRAAL was used to compute a pairwise all-to-all network similarity matrix between metabolic networks of a group of species and then build their phylogenetic tree. All of this was achieved using solely network topological information.

References

Networks